Timeless Romance is a 1998 Hong Kong comedy film directed by Jeffrey Lau and David Lai, starring Tony Leung Chiu-wai. It won "Best Screenplay" and "Film of Merit" at the 1999 Hong Kong Film Critics Society Awards.

External links
 

1998 films
Films directed by Jeffrey Lau
Films directed by David Lai
Films shot in Hong Kong
Films about time travel
Films set in Hong Kong
Films set in the Three Kingdoms
Hong Kong comedy films
1990s fantasy comedy films
1998 comedy films
1990s Hong Kong films